Carl Otto Klose (December 5, 1891 – January 15, 1988) was an American rower who competed in the 1920 Summer Olympics. In 1920 he was part of the American boat, which won the silver medal in the coxed fours event.

References

External links
 Athlete profile on the IOC website

1891 births
1988 deaths
Rowers at the 1920 Summer Olympics
Olympic silver medalists for the United States in rowing
American male rowers
Medalists at the 1920 Summer Olympics